Benik Abrahamyan (born 31 July 1985) is an Armenian-Georgian shot putter. He competed at the 2016 Summer Olympics in the men's shot put event; his result of 18.72 meters in the qualifying round did not qualify him for the final.
He was suspended for being doping positive just before 2020 Summer Olympics.

References

1985 births
Georgian people of Armenian descent
Living people
Shot putters from Georgia (country)
Male shot putters
Olympic athletes of Georgia (country)
Athletes (track and field) at the 2016 Summer Olympics